Maulana Habibur Rahman Nomani (21 August 1926 - 17 August 2005) was an Indian politician from Uttar Pradesh and belongs to the Indian National Congress.

Political career
He served as a member of the Uttar Pradesh Legislative Assembly from 1969 to 1974, member of the Uttar Pradesh Legislative Council from 1975 to 80, Minister of State and Deputy Minister of Transport in the Government of Uttar Pradesh from 1970 to 1972 and again from 1976 to 1977. He was nominated to the Rajya Sabha in 1993 and served till 1999. Maulana Nomani was General Secretary of the Uttar Pradesh Congress Committee from 1973 to 1975. He died on 17 August 2005 at his hometown.

Sources
Brief Biodata

Nominated members of the Rajya Sabha
Uttar Pradesh MLAs 1969–1974
People from Mau
People from Mau district
1926 births
2005 deaths
Indian National Congress politicians from Uttar Pradesh